Jorge Luis Hinojosa Moreno (born 27 September 1954) is a Mexican politician affiliated with the National Action Party. As of 2014 he served as Deputy of the LIX Legislature of the Mexican Congress as a plurinominal representative.

References

1954 births
Politicians from Nuevo León
Members of the Chamber of Deputies (Mexico)
National Action Party (Mexico) politicians
Living people
20th-century Mexican politicians
21st-century Mexican politicians
Municipal presidents in Nuevo León
Monterrey Institute of Technology and Higher Education alumni
Deputies of the LIX Legislature of Mexico